Erasmo Alfonso Cáffaro Durán, most known as Niní Cáffaro (born November 25, 1939 in San Pedro de Macorís, Dominican Republic), is an internationally known singer.

Biography
Cáffaro began singing gospel while attending elementary school. He started his professional career as a singer in 1959, participating in the Santo Domingo television show La Hora del Moro, hosted by Rafael Solano and transmitted by Rahintel.

In 1961 he made his first recording, Violeta. Later, in 1962, he recorded Juan Lockward's song "Ayúdame a olvidar".

In 1965, Cáffaro continued his career with the hit song "En ruinas", written by Rafael Solano. Later, he recorded a cover of the famous hit song: "Cada vez más".

Cáffaro became more widely known when he won the First Prize Award of the Festival de la Cancion Dominicana in 1968 with Rafael Solano's song "Por Amor". This propelled him to international fame. The next year, he won one of the awards in the first Festival de la Cancion Latina in Mexico Later, in 1973, he won the third award in the Festival OTI de la Canción in Brazil. Cáffaro subsequently performed concerts in Puerto Rico, Colombia, the United States, Venezuela, Spain, Curaçao, Aruba and Cuba. He became known as El Señor de los Festivales or "The Festival Master."

Nini Cáffaro is still active as a singer. He currently works for the Cervecería Nacional Dominicana. Cáffaro is married with four children and six grandchildren.

Discography 

 Niní Cáffaro y Sus Éxitos (1960)
 Para Ustedes (1965)
 Qué Grande Es el Amor (1967)
 Por Amor (1968)
 Está Bien (1970)
 Niní Cáffaro (1973)
 Viejo Amigo (1994)

References

Cáffaro Recibe Reconocimiento
Nini Cáffaro AOL Biography

1939 births
Living people
Dominican Republic people of Italian descent
20th-century Dominican Republic male singers